Timothy Alan Sherwood (born 6 February 1969) is an English professional football manager and former player who played as a midfielder.

As a player, he was a midfielder from 1987 until 2005, notably as captain of Blackburn Rovers' Premier League title-winning side in 1995. He also played for Watford, Norwich City, Tottenham Hotspur, Portsmouth and Coventry City. He made three appearances for the England national team in 1999.

Sherwood began his coaching career at Tottenham Hotspur, progressing from assistant first team coach to manager in a five-year spell, then managing the club from December 2013 to his dismissal in May 2014. He resumed his managerial career at Aston Villa in February 2015, taking them to that season's FA Cup final and saving them from relegation from the Premier League, until being sacked in October 2015. Sherwood was director of football at Swindon Town from November 2016 until June 2017.

Club career

Early career
Born in Borehamwood, Hertfordshire, Sherwood supported Arsenal as a child. He made his debut for Watford against Sheffield Wednesday on 12 September 1987. He made a total of 32 league appearances in Division Two for Watford before moving to Norwich City in July 1989. He played 88 games scoring 13 goals for Norwich before joining Blackburn Rovers in February 1992.

Blackburn Rovers
As one of Kenny Dalglish's first signings for Blackburn, he initially struggled to make the first team but went on to become a core player. Under his captaincy, Blackburn finished second in the Premiership in 1993–94 before winning it the following season.

Tottenham Hotspur
With Sherwood unsettled in 1999 and having family and business links in Hertfordshire, George Graham paid a reported fee of £3 million to bring him to Tottenham Hotspur in the first week of February 1999. He made his debut for Spurs as an 87th-minute substitute for Mauricio Taricco in the 0–0 draw with Coventry on 6 February. He was cup-tied for their victory in the 1999 Football League Cup Final. Sherwood won a runners-up medal with Spurs in the 2002 League Cup Final, when they were beaten by his former club Blackburn.

Portsmouth
In January 2003, Sherwood informed the press that he had had a major argument with Spurs manager Glenn Hoddle and that Hoddle had told him that he would never play for the club again. He left Tottenham, moving to Portsmouth on an initial four-month contract on 29 January. Upon signing he immediately became a regular in the side that went on to win the First Division Championship that season, scoring once in the process, in a 5–0 win away to Millwall on 1 March. Sherwood remained an important member of the Pompey squad for the first half of the 2003–04 Premier League season, scoring a brace in a 5–2 win against Third Division Northampton Town in the League Cup second round on 23 September. He broke his leg against Tottenham on 26 December, after a challenge by his former teammate Taricco. It was to be his last match for the club as, along with fellow veteran Teddy Sheringham, he was released in the 2004 close season.

Coventry City
On 9 July 2004, Sherwood signed for Peter Reid's Coventry City on a two-year deal with Coventry and said that he would "desperately like to achieve promotion" with the club. Although he was the captain, he was unpopular with fans, due to his frequent injuries, high wages and decision to do television punditry during his spell. At the end of the 2004–05 season, Coventry had not been promoted and the club announced that Sherwood could leave on a free transfer. He parted company with the Sky Blues by mutual consent on 1 July 2005.

International career
During his time with Blackburn Rovers he added an England B cap to the England Under 21 honours he picked up whilst at Norwich.

At the age of 30, Sherwood made his debut for England in their 3–1 UEFA Euro 2000 qualification victory over Poland at Wembley on 27 March 1999, under new manager Kevin Keegan. He earned a further two caps that year: in a 1–1 friendly draw with Hungary in Budapest on 28 April, and a goalless qualifying draw with Sweden at Wembley on 5 June.

Managerial career

Tottenham Hotspur
In October 2008, Sherwood joined Tottenham Hotspur as assistant first team coach, under new manager Harry Redknapp. Sherwood became Technical Director in 2012 and in that role led Spurs' Under-21 side in the inaugural Under-21 Premier League season, guiding the side to finish top in both group and elite stages. Sherwood's side eventually lost the league final 3–2 to Manchester United.

On 16 December 2013, Tottenham announced that Sherwood would "assume first team coaching duties" following the departure of André Villas-Boas as the manager. He lost his first game in charge, 2–1 at home to West Ham in the fifth round of the League Cup, but four days later managed a 3–2 Premier League win over Southampton. On 23 December, Spurs named Sherwood as their new head coach, handing him an 18-month contract until the end of the 2014–15 season. His last match as Spurs manager was a 3–0 win over Aston Villa on 11 May 2014. With this win Sherwood achieved a sixth-place finish in the league with Spurs with a total of 69 league points. Tim Sherwood was best known for being on the receiving end of Jorge Jesus' famous touchline dance, when he held up 3 fingers to indicate that Benfica had just scored 3 goals during their Europa League tie in 2014. Sherwood was sacked by chairman Daniel Levy on 13 May 2014.

Aston Villa

On 14 February 2015, Sherwood was appointed as the new manager of Aston Villa. The announcement was made via the club's official Twitter page, following the sacking of Paul Lambert on 11 February. Although he attended the following day's 2–1 win over Leicester City in the FA Cup and gave a half-time team-talk, his first game in official control of the team was at home to Stoke City almost a week later. Villa lost the game 2–1 after a 93rd-minute penalty from Victor Moses. After also losing his second game in charge, this time going down 1–0 to Newcastle United, Sherwood's first win came on 3 March 2015 against West Midlands rivals West Bromwich Albion. The game finished 2–1, with Christian Benteke scoring a last-minute penalty, which shadowed the decision that went against Villa in the Stoke game. Sherwood led Villa to Wembley for the first time since 2010 just four days later, after winning 2–0 in the FA cup quarter-final again against West Bromwich Albion. Sherwood then led Villa to a third straight win, a 4–0 away win over relegation rivals Sunderland in which all goals were scored in the first half. On 19 April 2015, Aston Villa reached the FA Cup Final for the first time since 2000, coming from behind to defeat Liverpool 2–1 in their semi-final at Wembley. However, they went on to lose the final 4–0 to Arsenal. After losing six consecutive matches, including a nine-game win-less run which left the team 19th in the table, Sherwood was sacked on 25 October 2015.

Swindon Town

On 10 November 2016, Sherwood was appointed director of football at League One side Swindon Town. On 14 June 2017, it was confirmed that Sherwood would leave his post, following the club's relegation to League Two.

Media work
Sherwood has often appeared as footballing pundit on Al-Jazeera Sport offering comments on English football. He was also a pundit for Setanta Sports for their Premier League coverage. Most recently, Sherwood has worked as a pundit on Amazon Prime Video's Premier League Goals Show.

Career statistics

Club

Managerial statistics

Honours

Player
Blackburn Rovers
Premier League: 1994–95

Portsmouth
Football League First Division: 2002–03

Individual
PFA Team of the Year: 1994–95 Premier League

Manager
Aston Villa
FA Cup runner-up: 2014–15

References

External links

Career information at ex-canaries.co.uk

1969 births
Living people
People from Borehamwood
Footballers from Hertfordshire
English footballers
Association football midfielders
Watford F.C. players
Norwich City F.C. players
Blackburn Rovers F.C. players
Tottenham Hotspur F.C. players
Portsmouth F.C. players
Coventry City F.C. players
English Football League players
Premier League players
England under-21 international footballers
England B international footballers
England international footballers
English football managers
Tottenham Hotspur F.C. non-playing staff
Aston Villa F.C. managers
Swindon Town F.C. non-playing staff
Tottenham Hotspur F.C. managers
Premier League managers
English association football commentators
Association football coaches